Filip Bundović (born February 16, 1994) is a Croatian professional basketball player or Cibona of the Croatian League and ABA League. Standing at  2.02 m, he plays at the power forward position.

Youth career
Bundović played for the youth selections for his hometown club Cedevita. He first came to attention of the national sports media in 2012 after Cedevita defeated the much favourized Zagreb in the finals of the Croatian junior basketball league. Zagreb's team included Dominik Mavra and future NBA players Dario Šarić and Mario Hezonja, but the Finals MVP award went to Bundović.

Professional career
He signed his first professional contract with Cedevita, but spent most of his four-year contract playing for the First division Zabok and Second division Mladost. In the fall of 2015, for the first time he went abroad by signing for the German League Mitteldeutscher for whom he played ten matches in which he scored 5.7 points with 2.2 rebounds on average. The second half of the season he spent playing for Estudiantes B. In the Liga EBA he played 13 games and averaged 14.1 points and 5.8 rebounds.

In 2017 he returned to his youth club Cedevita where he played for the B team in  the Croatian League. In 14 played games he made 13.7 points and 4.7 rebounds in average. In March 2017 he signed for Zrinjski Mostar for the rest of the season. In the Bosnian League he averaged only 3.4 points.

Bundović started the 2017–18 season in Šibenik. Until his departure from Šibenik in the 15 games he played in the Croatian League he made 11.6 points and 4.5 rebounds in an average 16 minutes spent on court. In March 2018 he left Šibenik. The rest of the season he spent in Z-Mobile Prishtina of the Kosovo Basketball Superleague. In Prishtina he achieved his most impressive stats: 20.8 ppg and 8.3 rpg. 

In September 2018 Bundović signed for Bandirma Kirmizi of the Turkish Basketball First League (second tier). After playing only one game for the Turkish side he moved back to home city, this time to Cibona. In July 2019, Bundović extended his contract with Cibona for another two years.

In February 2021, Bundović left Cibona and joined Rabotnički of the Macedonian First League and ABA League Second Division.

In September, 2021, Bundović returned to the Croatian League signing a two-month contract with Cedevita Junior.

After spending a season in Cedevita Junior, in September 2022, he returned to Cibona.

National team career
Bundović played for the Croatian national team youth selections. He played for the Croatia national under-16 basketball team at the 2010 FIBA Europe Under-16 Championship where his team won the gold medal. He was the team's leader in scoring and rebounds second to Dario Šarić only. He missed the 2012 FIBA Europe Under-18 Championship where Croatia won gold again because of an injury. He later played at the 2011 FIBA Under-19 World Championship and 2014 FIBA Europe Under-20 Championship, winning the 8th and 4th place respectively.

Bundović debuted for the Croatian A team in November 2021 at the 2023 FIBA Basketball World Cup qualification game against Slovenia. He was the top scorer for Croatia at that game.

References

External links
 ABA League Profile
 eurobasket.com Profile
 EuroCup Profile
 FIBA Profile (archive)
 realGM Profile

1994 births
Living people
ABA League players
Croatian expatriate basketball people in Spain
Croatian expatriate basketball people in Turkey
Croatian men's basketball players
GKK Šibenik players
KB Prishtina players
KK Cedevita players
KK Cibona players
KK Zabok players
Mitteldeutscher BC players
Power forwards (basketball)
Basketball players from Zagreb
KK Rabotnički players
KK Cedevita Junior players